Edward Aggrey-Fynn (24 November 1934 – January 2005) was a Ghanaian footballer. He competed in the men's tournament at the 1964 Summer Olympics.

References

External links
 
 

1934 births
2005 deaths
Ghanaian footballers
Ghana international footballers
Olympic footballers of Ghana
Footballers at the 1964 Summer Olympics
1963 African Cup of Nations players
Africa Cup of Nations-winning players
Place of birth missing
Association football midfielders
Accra Hearts of Oak S.C. players
Ghanaian football managers
Ghana national football team managers